Verso is the left-hand page of a folded sheet or bound item, such as a book, broadsheet, or pamphlet.

Verso may also refer to:

Music
Verso (music), genre of the verset or alternatim in Iberian organ music

Toyota cars in Europe
Toyota Yaris Verso, a mini MPV
Toyota Corolla Verso, a compact MPV
Toyota Verso, a compact MPV, the successor to the Corolla Verso
Toyota Avensis Verso, a mid-size MPV

Publishing, games and business
Verso Books, a book publishing company specialising in books about left-wing politics
Verso Recto, a board game
Verso Corporation, a pulp and paper company

People
Antonio il Verso (1565–1621), Italian composer
Enrico Lo Verso (born 1964), Italian actor